Lin Chun-hong (born 13 November 1965) is a Taiwanese swimmer. He competed in two events at the 1984 Summer Olympics.

References

External links
 

1965 births
Living people
Taiwanese male swimmers
Olympic swimmers of Taiwan
Swimmers at the 1984 Summer Olympics
Place of birth missing (living people)